Welcome to Trini Country is a country music album by guitarist and singer Trini Lopez, released in 1968 by Reprise Records (RS 6300).

Track listing
"Gentle on My Mind" (John Hartford) - (2:32)
"Crazy Arms" (Charles Seals, Ralph Mooney) - (2:20)
"Devil Woman" (M.D. Robinson) - (3:25)
"Once a Day" (Bill Anderson) - (2:00)
"Green, Green Grass of Home" (Curly Putman) - (3:10)
"Good Old Mountain Dew" (Jack Clement, T. L. Garrett, Trini Lopez) - (2:02)
"Flowers on the Wall" (Lewis DeWitt) - (2:14)
"If The Whole World Stopped Lovin'" (Ben Peters) - (2:30)
"Lonely Weekends" (Charlie Rich) - (2:14)
"Four Strong Winds" (Ian Tyson) - (2:27)
"Shanghied" (Mel Tillis) - (2:09)
"Mental Journey"  (Leon Ashley, Margie Singleton) - (1:57)

Production 
 Recorded at Columbia Studios, Nashville, Tennessee.
 Arranged by Don Tweedy

Other Contributors
 vocal accompaniment by The Jordanaires

References

1968 albums
Reprise Records albums
Trini Lopez albums
Albums produced by Snuff Garrett
Country albums by American artists